Coleophora fuscicornis is a moth of the family Coleophoridae. It is found on the Israel, Syria and Turkey. Records for Great Britain refer to Coleophora amethystinella.

The length of the forewings is 9-10.5 mm for males and 6.5 mm for females. Adults are on wing in March in Israel. Further north, the flight time is probably later in the year.

References

fuscicornis
Moths described in 1846
Moths of Europe
Moths of Asia